Burgis Beach is a hamlet in the Canadian province of Saskatchewan.

Geography 
The community is on the eastern shore of Good Spirit Lake in the RM of Good Lake No. 274. The resorts of Sandy Beach and Parkland Resort are adjacent to the hamlet and the eastern boundary of Good Spirit Lake Provincial Park is to the south.

Demographics 

See also 
List of communities in Saskatchewan
List of hamlets in Saskatchewan

References 

Designated places in Saskatchewan
Good Lake No. 274, Saskatchewan
Organized hamlets in Saskatchewan
Division No. 9, Saskatchewan